David Rutherford may refer to:

 David Rutherford (cricketer) (born 1976), English cricketer
 David Rutherford (ice hockey) (born 1987), Canadian ice hockey player
 Dave Rutherford, Canadian conservative political talk show host

See also
 David Rutherford-Jones (born 1958), retired British Army officer